Argentina Díaz Lozano (December 5, 1909 – August 13, 1999) was the pseudonym for the Honduran writer Argentina Bueso Mejía. She was a journalist and novelist, who wrote in the romantic style with feminist themes. She won numerous awards for her books, including the  Golden Quetzel from Guatemala, the Honduran National Literature Prize Ramón Rosa" and the "Order Cruzeiro do Sud" from Brazil. She was admitted to the Academia Hondureña de la Lengua and is the only Central American woman whose work has officially contended for a Nobel Prize for Literature.

Biography
Argentina Bueso Mejía's year of birth has been cited as 1909, 1910 and 1917, but is generally accepted as 15 December 1912 in Santa Rosa de Copan, Honduras to businessman Manuel Bueso Pineda and Trinidad Mejía. She attended Coligio María Auxiliadora in Tegucigalpa between 1925 and 1928 and then completed her secondary education at Holy Name Academy in Tampa, Florida. In 1929, she married Porfirio Díaz Lozano  and adopted both of his surnames as her literary name. She graduated with a degree in journalism from the Universidad de San Carlos de Guatemala.

She began writing for newspapers while studying in Guatemala and published articles in Diario de Centroamerica, La Hora, El Imparcial, and Prensa Libre and at one point had a weekly column called "Jueves Literarios" (Literary Thursdays) that was carried in several Guatemalan papers. Her first novel, Perlas de mi rosario (cuentos) was published in 1930 and followed by several others. Her first important recognition came in 1944 with Peregrinaje (Pilgrimage), which won first literature prize in Latin American in a contest sponsored by the Pan-American Union and the publisher Farrar & Rinehart. The prize resulted in her book being published in Spanish in Santiago, Chile and in English by Farrar & Rinehart under the title Enriqueta and I, as well as European recognition. Between 1945 and 1955, Díaz Lozano worked in the library of the Institute of Anthropology and History at the University of San Carlos. She was also involved in feminist causes, attending the Primer Congreso Interamericano de Mujeres on behalf of the Comités Pro Paz y Libertad (Committee for Peace and Liberty) of San Pedro Sula and Tegucigalpa.

Around 1951, she divorced her first husband, keeping his name, and sometime between 1952 and 1954, she married Guatemalan diplomat Darío Morales García. In 1956, Díaz Lozano accompanied Morales to Belgium, where Morales took up a post at the Consul of Guatemala in Antwerp, Belgium. While in Europe, she studied Fine Arts at the University of Utrecht in the Netherlands and published several books in French. Her book Mansión in la bruma was adapted for the stage by Ligia Bernal de Samayoa. In 1964, the book won a Golden Quetzal from Guatemala as best book of the year and Díaz Lozano returned from Belgium to be appointed Cultural Attaché for the Honduran Embassy in Guatemala.

In 1967 and 1968, she conducted a series of interviews with the vice president of Guatemala Clemente Marroquín Rojas and though she did not necessarily agree with his politics she found him an interesting personality. In 1968, she published a biography of him and was awarded the Honduran National Literature Prize "Ramón Rosa" and admitted to the Academia Hondureña de la Lengua, as well as receiving the "Order Cruzeiro do Sud" from the government of Brazil. In 1971, she began the magazine Revista Istmeña and serialized a novel, Su hora under the pseudonym "Suki Yoto". In 1986, the novel would be published under the name Caoba y orquídeas: novela. In 1973, she published Aquel año rojo: novela and in June of that year was nominated as a candidate for the Nobel Prize for Literature. Her nomination was accepted and she was an official candidate for the 1974 award. Díaz Lozano is the only Central American Woman whose works have been an official candidate for the Nobel Prize of Literature.

After the 1976 Guatemala earthquake, Díaz Lozano made her home in Antwerp and traveled back and forth between Belgium and Guatemala, continuing to publish into the 1990s. In February, 1999 she decided to make a trip to visit her homeland in Honduras.

Díaz Lozano died on 13 August 1999 in Tegucigalpa, Honduras.

Awards
1944: Best Novel, Peregrinaje, Latin American Novel Contest Pan-American Union and Farrar & Rinehart 
1964: Book of the Year, Mansión in la bruma, Golden Quetzel (Guatemala)
1968: Honduran National Literature Prize "Ramón Rosa" and admitted to the Academia Hondureña de la Lengua
1968: Order Cruzeiro do Sud, Brazil
1974 Considered for a Nobel Prize for Literature

Selected works
 Perlas de mi rosario (cuentos) Tegucigalpa, Honduras: Talleres Tipográficos Nacionales (1930) (in Spanish)
 Luz en la senda, novela Honduras: Tipográficos Nacionales, (1937) (in Spanish)
 Método de mecanografía al tacto Guatemala: Talleres del Centro editorial (1939) (in Spanish)
 Topacios, cuentos Tegucigalpa, Honduras: Editorial Calderón (1940) (in Spanish)
 Peregrinaje Santiago, Chile: Zig-Zag (1944) (in Spanish)
 Enriqueta and I New York: Farrar & Rinehart, Inc. (1944) (in English)
 Mayapán: novela histórica Guatemala: Editorial del Ministerio de Educación Pública (1950) (In Spanish) (Reprinted in English by Indian Hills, Colorado: Falcon's Wing Press (1955))
 49 días en la vida una mujer: novela histórica México: Editora Latino Americana (1956) (in Spanish)
 Amberes en mis sueños Antwerp: s.n., (1960) (in Spanish)
 Il faut vivre Brussels: Simone Eve Landercy (1960) (in French)
 Sandalias sobre Europa Guatemala: Asociación de Autores y Amigos del Libro Nacional (1964) (in Spanish)
 La maison dans la brume: roman Brussels: Simone Eve Landercy (1964) (in French)
 Fuego en la ciudad; novela histórica México: B. Costa-Amie (1966) (in Spanish)
 Aquí viene un hombre; biografía de Clemente Marroquín Rojas, político, periodista y escritor de Guatemala México: B. Costa-Amie (1968) (in Spanish)
 Aquel año rojo: novela México: B. Costa-Amic (1973) (in Spanish)
 Eran las doce ... y de noche: un amor y una época: novela México: B. Costa-Amic (1976) (in Spanish)
 And we have to live = Y tenemos que vivir Palos Verdes, California: Morgan Press (1978) (in English) and Guatemala: Editorial "José de Pineda Ibarra" (in Spanish)
 Ciudad errante (el hombre sin edad): novela en escenario histórico México: B. Costa-Amic (1983) (in Spanish)
 Caoba y orquídeas: novela Guatemala: CENALTEX, Ministerio de Educación (1986) (in Spanish)
 Ha llegado una mujer México: Editorial  Diana (1990) (in Spanish)

Recording from the Library of Congress 
Argentina Díaz Lozano reading from her own work (1960).

External links
 WorldCat publications list

Argentina Diaz Lozano recorded at the Library of Congress for the Hispanic Division’s audio literary archive on September 26, 1960

Notes 

 Her date of birth has been variously cited as 1912, 1910, 1909, but recent findings by her family show she was born on December 5th, 1909 and was baptized in Santa Rosa de Copan on September 12, 1912 as Trinidad Mejia.

References

1909 births
1999 deaths
Honduran feminists
Honduran suffragists
Honduran women activists
People from Santa Rosa de Copan
20th-century Honduran women writers
20th-century Honduran writers
Honduran novelists
Honduran women novelists
20th-century novelists